Earth Rocker is the tenth studio album by American rock band Clutch. It was released on March 15, 2013 by Weathermaker Music. Earth Rocker is the first studio album to be released by Clutch since Strange Cousins from the West in 2009. The album was produced by Machine, who also produced the band's 2004 album Blast Tyrant.

Background
Earth Rocker has been described as heavier and faster than the preceding albums. Drummer J.P. Gaster revealed that this ferocity may be attributed to Clutch's recent touring experience with Motörhead and Thin Lizzy:

Clutch recorded 14 songs, although only 11 made it on the album. Frontman Neil Fallon expressed the opinion that they were "great songs", but the band was

Songwriting and recording
The band took a different approach to the songwriting for Earth Rocker by engaging in extensive pre-production work to flesh out the songs more fully prior to entering the studio. Dan Maines attributed this to the recording preferences of the producer, Machine, who "likes to have all the material in the bag before he hits record." The band recorded to a click track at its rehearsal space and then played along in the studio. As Maines explained, "the idea of doing any 'jamming' doesn't enter the picture. Our intent with these songs was to end up with something that had an intense focus of energy; each song needed to be direct with a no frills punch."

This had a cascading effect upon other aspects of the songs, with Tim Sult noting that the approach resulted in additional soloing: "I would've never expected to be playing as many solos on this album, but they definitely had more of a direction than they usually do. It definitely took a lot more concentration, but I walked away from this album liking them more than I have on any other album."

Neil Fallon opined that the planned songwriting approach resulted from a lack of satisfaction with aspects of previous albums:

Reception

The album met with generally favorable reviews, with About.com comparing it to Blast Tyrant and praising it for "kick(ing) harder than a mule on steroids". Metal Injection described Earth Rocker as "a consistently rocking and rolling beast. On the journey through the world of modern hard-rock, Clutch is like the mad village storyteller. You might not get what he's trying to tell you right away, but after a while you discover he's the one you should have listened to all along." However, Q Magazine criticized the album as being "business as usual" despite being "a little more concise than their usual output".

The album debuted at No. 15 on the Billboard 200 and No. 6 on the Top Rock Albums chart, selling 22,000 copies in its first week. The album has sold 80,000 copies in the United States as of September 2015.

Track listing 
All tracks written by Clutch.

Original release

2014 deluxe edition
A three-disc deluxe edition of Earth Rocker was released on June 24, 2014, containing: the original album with two bonus tracks, a live recording of the album (originally only available on vinyl) on CD, and a live DVD of the show played at the Ogden Theatre, Denver on November 14, 2013. It also has new artwork and liner notes.

 The songs "Night Hag" and "Scavengers" are the bonus tracks on the deluxe edition.

Personnel
Clutch
 Neil Fallon – vocals, guitar, harmonica, percussion
 Tim Sult – guitar
 Dan Maines – bass
 Jean-Paul Gaster – drums, percussion

Technical personnel
 Machine – production, engineering and mixing
 Alberto De Icaza – additional engineering and editing
 Randy LeBouf – editing
 Zakk Cervini and Justin Aufdemkampe – assistant to producer
 Paul Logas – mastering

Chart performance

References

External links
 Clutch's official website
 Official album website

2013 albums
Clutch (band) albums
Albums produced by Machine (producer)